Sudanese Americans are Americans of  Sudanese ancestry, or Sudanese who have American citizenship. Sudanese Americans may also include children born in the United States to an American (or of other origin) parent and a Sudanese parent. Many Sudanese immigrated to the United States in the 1990s as war refugees, escaping of civil war in Sudan.
In the 2012 American Community Survey, 48,763 people identified themselves as Sudanese or Sudanese Americans who—or whose ancestors—have emigrated from their native land to the U.S. in the 1980s, 1990s and 2000s.

History 
With the Civil War in Sudan, in 1983, many Sudanese and South Sudanese were settled in refugee camps in other neighboring African countries (Egypt, Ethiopia, Kenya, Uganda). Since 1990, Sudanese refugees in these camps have been accepted in the United States. So, most of the refugees from Sudan arrived in the United States after 1991,  although most them hailed from South Sudan (who arrived to this country, basically, from 2001, although also were established there some Sudanese refugee communities from North Sudan). So, many North Sudanese were established in places such as  Maine (settling them eventually in cities such as Portland - where they arrived in 1993, being the Darfurian people one of the early Sudanese people in settled there - and Lewiston), or Omaha, Nebraska (where already had a Sudanese community in 1997).

Demography
According to the 2000 Census, the largest Sudanese communities (the 2000 US census did not distinguish between North and South as South Sudan was not yet an independent nation) were New York City, Detroit, Des Moines (in Iowa), Alexandria (Virginia) in the Washington DC metropolitan area, Los Angeles and San Diego. Sudanese and South Sudanese American communities are also found in other cities such as Greensboro, NC, Dallas, TX, Flint, MI, Washington Metropolitan Area and many other cities. The states of Virginia, Washington, Maryland, California, Idaho, Minnesota and North Carolina have the largest Sudanese populations of United States.

It is known that at least since 1997, many Sudanese and South Sudanese live in Omaha, Nebraska. There are 10 Sudanese and South Sudanese tribes, among which are the North Sudanese Maban people. According to the UNO School of Social Work, in Omaha Sudanese communities from Sudan's Central provinces from the Nuba Mountains and Darfur have been established. Other Sudanese immigrants were also established there. Seventeen tribes (with around 2,000 Sudanese and South Sudanese, between them, the South Sudanese Acholi tribe) also live in Maine. Maine is, indeed, the place that has the largest group of resettled Darfurians in the United States.

Several Sudanese ethnic groups live in the United States, amongst them the Maban and Fur people.

Political dissidents in Northern Sudan emigrated, fleeing from the oppressive Muslim fundamentalist regime in Khartoum. Many of them migrated to refugee camps in neighboring countries, particularly Ethiopia, to escape forced conscription or, to a lesser extent, religious persecution directed specifically against followers of the Baháʼí Faith. From these camps, many were accepted to the United States. Sudanese or South Sudanese immigrated to America from different regions of Sudan due to political disagreements, educational and vocational opportunities or for family reunification, as well.

According to estimates for 2015 to 2019 from The Migration Policy Institute, there were 46,700 Sudanese immigrants living in The USA. The top six counties of settlement were as following: 

1) Fairfax County, Virginia ---------------------- 2,500

2) Guilford County, North Carolina --------- 1,300

3) Tarrant County, Texas ------------------------ 1,100 

4) Maricopa County, Arizona ----------------- 1,100

5) Douglas County, Nebraska ---------------- 1,100

6) Dallas County, Texas ------------------------- 1,100

Health care 
Most Sudanese that established themselves in the U.S. have numerous difficulties in accessing health care, although in varying degrees depending on factors such as educational level and having obtained biomedical care in Sudan. Among the linguistic and educational differences are added factors such as the discrepancy of name and date of birth, and a general lack of prior medical documentation, causing confusion in the American health system or admission into hospitals.

With no care or checkups in Sudan, immigrants from this country are found with medical conditions previously unknown to them. Many Sudanese have diabetes, hypertension, food allergies, severe cases of depression, loss of vision and hearing, parasitism, and dental problems, although its feeding change in US.

In addition, they often leave their medication when symptoms resolve, not completing therapy.

Organizations 
Sudanese Americans (whether from North or South Sudan) created several associations. So, because of the great difficulties faced by Sudanese in  United States, such as language and skill, was founded the New Sudan-American Hope (NSAH) in 1999 by a group of Sudanese from Rochester, Minnesota, to help Sudanese refugees. So, help with various aspects of relocation. Almost a decade later and with members from diverse backgrounds, NSAH still helps refugees in Rochester and also is a source of education about the consequences of the war in Sudan.

Notable people

 Nawal M. Nour, gynecologist 
 Abdullahi Ahmed An-Na'im, professor
 Elfatih Eltahir, Professor of Hydrology and Climate at the Massachusetts Institute of Technology MIT
 Mohammed Adam El-Sheikh, imam
 Oddisee, musician
 Safia Elhillo, poet
 Bas, born in Paris to Sudanese parents
 Dua Saleh, singer
Girmay Zahilay, American politician born in Sudan to Ethiopian parents

See also
 Sudanese Australians
 Sudanese British
 Sudan–United States relations

References

 
American
 
Political refugees in the United States